Čačić is a Croatian and Serbian family name:

 Ante Čačić (born 1953), Croatian football manager
 Božidar Čačić (born 1972), Croatian footballer
 Frane Čačić (born 1980), Croatian footballer
 Mike Cacic (1937-2008), Canadian football defensive lineman
 Nikola Čačić (born 1990), Croatian tennis player
 Radimir Čačić (born 1949), Croatian politician
 Sandra Cacic (born 1974), American tennis player

See also
 Ćaćić

Croatian surnames
Serbian surnames